Candlewood Lake is a manmade lake located in Fairfield and Litchfield counties of Western Connecticut, in the northeastern United States. At , it is the largest lake in Connecticut and the largest lake within a  radius of New York City. The lake is bordered by five towns: Brookfield, Danbury, New Fairfield, New Milford, and Sherman.  Some of the most expensive real estate in the Greater Danbury area is located along the shores of the lake.

Creation

Concept

On July 15, 1926, Connecticut Light and Power Company's board of directors approved a plan to create the first large-scale operation of pumped storage facilities in the US. By creating the lake and pumping it full of water from the Housatonic River, then letting the water pour down the penstock and into a turbine, the utility could produce electricity.

Candlewood Lake was formed behind a hydroelectric dam south of the Rocky River's junction with the Housatonic River in New Milford. Similar to a giant battery, its main purpose is to store water during periods of low electrical demand for power generation when demand is high. Excess electricity from the valley's hydro-system is used to pump water up a hillside into the lake from the nearby Housatonic River during spring, and overnight hours in summer. The water is then allowed to flow back down into the river when extra electricity is needed in the grid, often during the region's mid-to-late summer heat waves. Power is generated by turbines that are spun by the water flowing into the river while pumping is done by reversing the impellers.

Construction

Some of the families refused to sell so their land was taken and flooded. Inhabitants were relocated, but many of the buildings were left standing and some farming equipment was left behind. The roads were not torn up before the valley was flooded. A small cemetery in the area where the lake was built was relocated.

Starting in late July 1926, nearly 1,400 men labored to create Connecticut's largest body of water. About 500 men from Maine and Canada hand-felled  of woodland, burning the lumber in massive bonfires. Several dams were built.

On February 25, 1928, the first pumping operation began pouring water into the valley from the Housatonic. Engineers had planned on the Rocky River and its tributaries filling the valley one-fourth of the way, with the generating plant pumping the remaining three-fourths of the water out of the Housatonic.

CL&P owned and operated the lake and hydroelectric power facilities until it was sold for $9 million in June 2006 due to deregulation of the electric power industry by the State in the late 1990s.  The lake and generation plant are currently owned by FirstLight Power Resources.

Recreation
Candlewood Lake is a popular tourist destination, and the area is home to many second homes of New York City residents. The lake is used for recreation year-round, although tourists primarily come during the summer months for swimming, fishing, boating, and golfing. Along its approximately  shoreline are tourist resorts and recreational facilities, including golf courses, beaches, and marinas.

There is a  daytime speed limit for boats and a  nighttime speed limit from 1/2 hour after sunset to 1/2 hour before sunrise. A  speed limit is in effect within  of shore, dock, moored vessels, and other places that the power company has marked as hazardous. Seaplanes are also permitted to land on the lake.

Scuba divers can investigate buildings from the era before the lake was created, follow underwater roads, and discover artifacts. Some of the notable underwater finds are Model Ts, plane wreckage from small craft that have hit the lake since then, and covered bridges.

Candlewood Lake is home to Chicken Rock, a large rock from which people jump into the water. There is also a rope swing that allows people to swing out over the water. It projects into the lake from the shore on the Sherman side of the New Fairfield-Sherman border, is the site of frequent injuries.

Candlewood Lake is home to many private beaches, such as Lynn Deming Park, Millstone Ridge, Candlewood Lake Club, and Sail Harbour Club.

Environmental preservation

The lake has an ongoing problem with the growth of eelgrass and Eurasian milfoil in shallower areas.

Attempts have been made to trim them with mechanical cutters on barges; this has had limited success. Various chemical and biological methods have been considered, tested and/or employed to fight the weeds. In December 2006, the Connecticut Department of Environmental Protection, working with members of the U.S. Environmental Protection Agency treated Candlewood Lake for its eelgrass and algae issues with an organic phosphate. Grass-eating weevils were tested in 2008 and 2010, and grass-eating carp were introduced in 2015.

In October 2016, zebra mussels were found on the Rocky River power station for the first time, reinforcing fears that the harmful invasive species will eventually make its way into the lake itself.

History 

A small village, Jerusalem, was submerged in the rising waters.

Even before the lake's filling was completed, it became apparent it would draw summer vacationers from as far away as New York City. Land prices on what would become the shoreline had already jumped to $1,000 an acre; summer developments appeared almost immediately.

Although it was almost called Lake Danbury, the new body of water ultimately got its name from New Milford's Candlewood Mountain, which was named after the Candlewood tree (Pinus rigida), whose sapling branches were sometimes used as candles by early settlers.

Islands 
There are 12 islands on Candlewood Lake:
Green Island
Deer Island
Cedar Island
Oak Island
Rock Island
Pine Island
Sand Island
Shipwreck Island
Skeleton Island
Thistle Island
Banger Islands
City Island

See also 

 Squantz Pond State Park

References

Bibliography 
Candlewood Lake by Susan Murphy, Gary Smolen, March 2005, 128 pages, "Images of America" series, Arcadia Publishing,  paperback ; 
Candlewood Lake (fiction) by Penny C. Sansevieri, May 2005, paperback

External links

 Candlewood Lake Authority
 Candlewood Lake Life | Experience Candlewood Lake Living!

Reservoirs in Connecticut
Geography of Danbury, Connecticut
Brookfield, Connecticut
Danbury, Connecticut
New Fairfield, Connecticut
New Milford, Connecticut
Lakes of Fairfield County, Connecticut
Sherman, Connecticut
Tourist attractions in Fairfield County, Connecticut
Protected areas of Fairfield County, Connecticut
1928 establishments in Connecticut
Pumped-storage hydroelectric power stations in the United States